The Marienberg Hills are a mountain range in East Sepik Province, Papua New Guinea. The Marienberg languages are spoken in the Marienberg Hills.

See also
Marienberg languages
Marienberg Rural LLG
Marienberg, Papua New Guinea

References

Mountain ranges of Papua New Guinea